Something to Live For is the first studio album by Irish trance producer and DJ John O'Callaghan, released May 28, 2007, on Discover.

Track listing

Personnel
Written and produced by John O'Callaghan

External links
 Something To Live For at Discogs

John O'Callaghan (musician) albums
2007 debut albums